Age of Impact is Explorers Club's first album, released in 1998. The album included guest appearances by guitarists Steve Howe and John Petrucci, singer James LaBrie, bassist Billy Sheehan and drummer Terry Bozzio.

Track listing

Personnel
Bret Douglas (1), Matt Bradley (2), James LaBrie (3 & 5),  D.C. Cooper (4)  – lead vocals
Trent Gardner – keyboards, trombone, lead vocals (5)
Derek Sherinian (1), Matt Guillory (1 & 5) – keyboards
Wayne Gardner – electric and acoustic guitars, bass
John Petrucci – guitar
Frederick Clarke  – nylon string guitar
James Murphy – guitar (1,4,5)
Steve Howe – acoustic guitar (4)
Billy Sheehan – bass
Terry Bozzio – drums
Brad Kaiser - MIDI percussion
Michael Bemesderfer  – flute, wind controller (3,4)

Production
Produced by Trent Gardner
Engineered by James Murphy
Mixed by Trent Gardner & Kevin Elson
Mastered by Kevin Lee

References

Explorers Club (band) albums
1998 albums